The Macleod Group was a short-lived pressure group and dining club associated with the 'left-wing' of Conservative Party that existed in 1975 before amalgamation with others to form the Tory Reform Group. It was composed of Tories who were considered progressive on many of the social issues of the time - for example, many supported the abolition of capital punishment - and strong supporters of Britain's membership of the EEC.

The group was established soon after the general elections of 1974 by Nicholas Scott. The President was David Knox, and the vice-presidents were Robert Carr, Lynda Chalker, Sir Nigel Fisher and Nicholas Scott.

In January 1975 the Macleod Group came out in support of Edward Heath in the 1975 Conservative leadership election. When Margaret Thatcher won the contest, the group expressed disappointment at her choices for the Shadow Cabinet. They were particularly displeased with the absence of Robert Carr, Peter Walker, and Nicholas Scott in the Shadow Cabinet, and complained that the common factor was neither age nor ability, but that they were all on the 'left' of the party.

In September 1975, the Macleod Group merged with Pressure for Economic and Social Toryism (Pest),the Progressive Tory Pressure Group and the Social Tory Action Group to form the Tory Reform Group and many prominent members in the Macleod Group went on to play a big role in the Tory Reform Group.

References

Organisations associated with the Conservative Party (UK)
1975 establishments in the United Kingdom